Ormesby St Michael is a small village and civil parish in the English county of Norfolk. Nearby are Ormesby Broad and Ormesby Little Broad, both part of the Trinity Broads within The Broads.

The villages name means 'Omr's farm/settlement'.

For the purposes of local government, the parish falls within the district of Great Yarmouth.

Ormesby Manor is a Grade II listed 19th manor house with an Italianate tower.

Notes

External links

.
Information from Genuki Norfolk on Ormesby St Michael.
http://kepn.nottingham.ac.uk/map/place/Norfolk/Ormesby%20St%20Margaret%20&%20St%20Michael

Villages in Norfolk
Civil parishes in Norfolk
Borough of Great Yarmouth